Robert O'Keeffe (16 August 1880 – 1949) was an Irish hurler who played for the Laois senior team.

O'Keeffe was a regular member of the starting fifteen during the 1914 and 1915 championship campaigns. During that time he won one All-Ireland medal and back-to-back Leinster medals.

At club level O'Keeffe had a lengthy career, playing with Mooncoin in Kilkenny, St Peter's in Meath and Borris-in-Ossory in Laois.

In retirement from playing O'Keeffe served as a high-ranking referee and was heavily involved in the administration of the GAA. He was chairman of the Leinster Council, before serving as president of the GAA from 1935 to 1938.

References

 

1880 births
1949 deaths
All-Ireland Senior Hurling Championship winners
Alumni of De La Salle Teacher Training College, Waterford
Borris-in-Ossory hurlers
Chairmen of Gaelic games governing bodies 
Hurling referees
Laois inter-county hurlers
Leinster inter-provincial hurlers
Leinster Provincial Council administrators
Mooncoin hurlers
Presidents of the Gaelic Athletic Association
St Peters Dunboyne hurlers